The 2001 international cricket season was from May to August 2001.

Season overview

May

Pakistan in England

June

India in Zimbabwe

2001 NatWest Series

2001 Zimbabwe Coca-Cola Cup

July

Australia in England

2001 Sri Lanka Coca-Cola Cup

West Indies in Zimbabwe

August

India in Sri Lanka

West Indies in Kenya

2001 Asian Test Championship

References

External links
2001 season on ESPN Cricinfo

2001 in cricket
International cricket competitions in 2001